This Is Goth! is a various artists compilation album released on  May 30, 2000, by Cleopatra Records.

Reception

MacKenzie Wilson of AllMusic said "This Is Goth is one of Cleopatra's many goth-rock/darkwave compilations, another look at the forerunners of the eclectic musical genre and those pushing the brooding art into the new millennium."

Track listing

Personnel
Adapted from the This Is Goth! liner notes.

Release history

References

External links 
 This Is Goth! at Discogs (list of releases)

2000 compilation albums
Cleopatra Records compilation albums